Spring Gully may refer to:
Australia
Spring Gully, South Australia, a locality in the District Council of Clare and Gilbert Valleys.
Spring Gully Conservation Park, South Australia
Spring Gully, Victoria, Australia
United States
Spring Gully, South Carolina